Benoit Clément (31 December 1963 – 23 July 2011) was a Canadian swimmer. He competed in the men's 4 × 200 metre freestyle relay at the 1984 Summer Olympics. He competed for the University of Michigan from 1982 through 1985.  Afterwards he competed in Masters Swimming in Canada.

References

External links
 

1963 births
2011 deaths
Olympic swimmers of Canada
Swimmers at the 1984 Summer Olympics
Swimmers from Montreal
Canadian male freestyle swimmers